Sarbanissa is a genus of moths of the family Noctuidae. The genus was erected by Francis Walker in 1875.

Species
 Sarbanissa albifascia Walker, 1865
 Sarbanissa bala Moore, 1865
 Sarbanissa catacoloides Walker, 1862
 Sarbanissa cirrha Jordan, 1912
 Sarbanissa flavida Leech, 1890
 Sarbanissa insocia Walker, 1865
 Sarbanissa interposita Hampson, 1910
 Sarbanissa jordani Clench, 1953
 Sarbanissa longipennis Walker, 1865
 Sarbanissa mandarina Leech, 1890
 Sarbanissa melanura Jordan, 1912
 Sarbanissa nepcha Moore, 1867
 Sarbanissa poecila Jordan, 1912
 Sarbanissa subflava Moore, 1877
 Sarbanissa sundana Holloway, 1982
 Sarbanissa transiens Walker, 1856
 Sarbanissa venosa Moore, 1879
 Sarbanissa venusta Leech, 1888
 Sarbanissa vitalis Jordan, 1926

References

Agaristinae